The Ardeu is a right tributary of the river Băcâia in Romania. It flows into the Băcâia in Bozeș.

References

Rivers of Romania
Rivers of Alba County
Rivers of Hunedoara County